Armando de Almeida (2 July 1893 – 6 February 1978) was a Brazilian footballer. He played in seven matches for the Brazil national football team from 1916 to 1919. He was also part of Brazil's squad for the 1916 South American Championship.

References

External links
 

1893 births
1978 deaths
Brazilian footballers
Brazil international footballers
Place of birth missing
Association footballers not categorized by position